Wuhan Metropolitan Area intercity railway or Wuhan Metropolitan Area intercity railway system is a network of higher-speed commuter railways in and around Wuhan, the capital of the Chinese province Hubei. The first line of the system opened at the end of 2013, two more in mid-2014, one in 2016.

System composition
The network will include the following lines:
 The Wuhan–Xianning intercity railway, opened on December 28, 2013. The system's first line connects Wuhan's Wuchang Railway Station with the city's southern suburbs and the city of Xianning. Initially, the service is very limited (a few trains a day), but eventually it will be brought to a commuter frequency.
 The Wuhan–Huangshi intercity railway and Wuhan–Huanggang intercity railway share tracks within Wuhan's eastern suburbs and then diverge. The Huangshi line goes toward Ezhou, Huangshi, and Daye, while the Huanggang line crosses the Yangtze River to Huanggang. The construction of the lines was largely completed by the end of December 2013.  After a period of testing, the two lines opened on June 18, 2014.  The Wuhan–Huangshi line also serves as the first section of the future Wuhan–Jiujiang Passenger Railway, opened in 2017.
 The Wuhan–Xiaogan intercity railway serves the city's northern suburbs, the Wuhan Tianhe International Airport, and the city of Xiaogan. Early on, it was expected to open in 2015. However, the completion date has been moved back. It is opened on December 1, 2016.

Preliminary plans exist for the construction of more lines (to Tianmen and Qianjiang) as well.

Ridership
In a report released during the Spring Festival travel season of 2015, the total ridership of the 3 lines of the Wuhan Metropolitan Area intercity railway was estimated at 25,000 a day; that was described as twice the daily amount outside of the peak travel season.

Notes

Transport in Hubei
High-speed railway lines in China
Railway lines opened in 2013
2013 establishments in China